Leon Keer (born 1980) is a Dutch pop-surrealist artist. 
He has created work on canvas and (3D) artwork on the streets across the world.  Leon Keer is a leading artist in anamorphic street art. His art has been showcased in Europe, the United States, Russia, Mexico, the United Arab Emirates, Australia, New Zealand, and several Asian countries. In addition to using optical illusion, he often presents his art by adding new technologies, such as augmented reality and video mapping. The art is temporary, but the images are shared all over the world via social media.

Leon generally paints contemporary themes which involves environmental concerns and raises questions about the livability in this world.

Leon Keer is one of the world’s foremost artists in 3D Street Art, the master of optical illusion. By playing with perspectives he creates incredible new worlds. A world in which you’re trapped in a gumball machine or come face-to-face with life-size gummy bears. This is the artist’s first monograph and, to honour the occasion, he also gives the reader a glimpse into his bag of tricks.

Career 

Leon Keer designs and creates 2-D, 3-D and 4-D street art in the Netherlands and abroad. The 3-D Lego terracotta army is one of those creations. It was painted at the 2011 international Sarasota Chalk Festival.

At 2010 festival in Sarasota he made a surreal street painting with Little red riding hood and Alice in Wonderland together, fighting against evil as main characters in the image.

The anamorphic painting Piggy Bank was a Japanese debut for Leon Keer in 2013 and a 3d street art debut for Fukuoka.

Experimenting with augmented reality combined with anamorphic art

3D mural 'Shattering' with AR made by Leon Keer in Helsingborg

Malta Gummy bears – artist Leon Keer created 3D art for Malta street art festival

Keer is often confused with Ego Leonard, the anonymous guerilla artist.

Leon Keer solo show 'Forced Perspective' at Wanrooij Gallery Amsterdam

References

External links 

 Pac-Man 3D Street Art
 Klokhuis
 Giant 3D Paintings of Gummy Bears Cleverly Interact with People Passing By
 Leon Keer the 3D explorer talks to ISSA
 3D street art: a question of perspective
 3D Street Art illusions that will play tricks on your mind

1970 births
Living people
Dutch artists
Street artists
Public art
Artists from Utrecht